Wolfach is a town in the Black Forest and part of the Ortenaukreis in Baden-Württemberg (Germany). It is a well-known spa town.

Geography

Geographical Position 
Wolfach lies where the two rivers Wolf and Kinzig meet in the Kinzig valley. The mixture of valleys and mountains is a characteristic of the town, which stretches between 250 and 880 m above sea level.

Villages within the borough of Wolfach include Kirnbach and Kinzigtal.

History 

The exact foundation year of Wolfach is not known. 
The history of the town Wolfach can be traced back to the year 1084, although some finding even point back to the Roman times.

On April 21, 1945, before fleeing the city, the Gestapo took the French resistants and political prisoners held in the prison of Wolfach to a forest outside of the town, forced them to dig their own graves, and shot them on the spot, just three hours before the arrival of the French 2nd Armored Division commanded by General Leclerc.

Tourism 
Wolfach hotels and bed & breakfast places have an occupancy rate of 128,000 nights each year (year 2000).

Government

City Council 
In the past years the city council consisted of:

Mayors 
 1811–1820: Johann Georg Neef
 1820–1829: Xavery Duppele
 1829–1834: Dr. Duttlinger
 1834–1839: Johann Baptist Baur
 1839–1861: Joseph Bührer
 1861–1874: Johann Georg Armbruster
 1874–1880: Hermann Vogt
 1880–1900: Friedrich Armbruster, (son of J. G. Armbruster)
 1900–1909: Bruno Burger
 1909–1918: Karl Friedrich Armbruster, (son of F. Armbruster)
 1918–1925: Gustav Bulacher
 1925–1936: August Hämmerle, (from 1933 NSDAP)
 1937–1941: Adolf Oehler (NSDAP), Oehler was since 1929 NSDAP-member, joined in  1940 the Waffen-SS and died in 1941 as a soldier
 1941–1945: Alfred Albanus 
 1945: Max Vivell, (gave the town to the commander of the marching in French troops)
 1945–1946: Johannes Faißt (temporarily)
 1946–1951: Hans Allgeier (1891–1951)
 1951–1978: Arthur Martin (1911–1999)
 1978–1991: Hans-Peter Züfle
 1992–2014: Gottfried Moser
 since 2015: Thomas Geppert

Coat of Arms 
The coat of arms of the town of Wolfach displays a golden wolf's hook rod on a blue background and is based on the "Wolfsangel" banner from the "Herren von Wolfach" (Lords of Wolfach) who established their control on the town in 1260.  It is believed that they adopted the wolf trap sign as their banner having cleared the area of wolves to establish the town.

International relations 

Wolfach is twinned with:
  Cavalaire-sur-Mer, France
  Richfield, Ohio 
  Kreuzlingen, Switzerland

Culture and Sights

Swabian-Alemannic Carnival 
Wolfach is said to be one of the towns rich in tradition of the Swabian-Alemannic Fastnacht.

Buildings 
 Fürstenberg castle
 Fortress ruin Alt-Wolfach
 Town Hall
 Catholic church St. Laurentius

Parks 
 Kurgarten
 Flößerpark
 Kinziganlagen

Regular Events 
 Swabian-Alemannic Carnival (‘Fastnacht’)
 City Fountain Festival (‘Stadtbrunnenfest’) 
 Biker-Weekend
 Long Table (‘Lange Tafel’)
 Flößerfest
 Open-Air Rockfest Moosenmättle
 Butchers Festival of the Fire Department (‘Schlachtfest der Freiwilligen Feuerwehr’)
 Wolfach Autumn (‘Wolfacher Herbst’)

Notable people

Sons and daughters of the town 
 Hans Klumbach (1904–1992), archaeologist and scholar of classical and provincial Roman studies
 Sylvia Wetzel (born 1949), Buddhist feminist
 Marco Horácio (born 1974), popular comedian on Portuguese television
 Thomas Dold (born 1984), athlete
 Markus Steuerwald (born 1989), volleyball player

People who are connected to the town 
 Gustav Trunk (1871–1936), politician, member of the German Centre Party; lived in Wolfach from 1897 to 1900 as beadle
 Otmar Freiherr von Verschuer (1896–1969), racial hygienist in the Third Reich; lived in Wolfach between 1898 and 1909, where he visited school

References

Notes

Book References 
 Disch Franz: Chronik der Stadt Wolfach. Wolfach, Karlsruhe 1920.
 Harter Hans: Adel und Burgen im oberen Kinziggebiet. Studien zur Besiedelung und hochmittelalterlichen Herrschaftsbildung im mittleren Schwarzwald. München 1992.
 Krausbeck Josef, Knauss Frieder: Masken unserer Stadt. Stuttgart 1974.
 Stadt Wolfach (Hrsg.): Schwarzwaldstadt mit Tradition. Wolfach, Kirnbach, Kinzigtal. Freiburg 1988.

External links

Administration and Authorities 
 City of Wolfach
 District Oberwolfach

Associations 
 Historic Association Wolfach
 Carnival club Wolfach
 Bike-Park Wolfach

Places of Interest, Sights 
 Vogtbauernhöfe
 Mineral and mathematics museum Oberwolfach
  Information about and images

Towns in Baden-Württemberg
Ortenaukreis
Baden